Sergio Bavini, known as Sérgio Reis (born June 23, 1940), is a Brazilian sertanejo singer, actor and politician. He has sold approximately 16 million copies of his more than 40 album releases.

Reis was born in São Paulo, and began working in radio stations and nightclubs as a teenager. In 1958, he released his first record, "Enganadora" b/w "Será", but did not garner any notice. In 1967 he was invited to record with The Jet Blacks, and the resulting singles – "Coração de Papel," "Nuvem Branquinha," "Fim de Sonho," and "Qual a Razão," all shot to the top of the Brazilian charts. He became a fixture on Jovem Guarda radio and television, writing songs for Jerry Adriani, Wanderley Cardoso, Nalva Aguiar, Deny e Dino, Marcos Roberto, and The Golden Boys.

Reis's style mixes caipira music with a heavy influence from American pop and country. Among his most well-known songs are "O Menino da Porteira," "O Menino da Gaita", "João de Barro", "Rei do Gado", "Cabocla Teresa" "Os Três Boiadeiros," and "Cavalo Zaino." Alongside his music career he has appeared often in film and television, including Brazilian soap operas.

In 2015, his album Amizade Sincera II, a partnership with Renato Teixeira, was nominated for the 16th Latin Grammy Awards in the Best Sertaneja Music Album category.

Discography

 1967 – Coração de Papel
 1969 – Anjo Triste
 1973 – Sérgio Reis
 1974 – João de Barro
 1975 – Saudade de Minha Terra
 1976 – Retrato do Meu Sertão
 1977 – Sérgio Reis – Disco de ouro
 1977 – O Menino da Porteira
 1977 – Relaciones Internacionales
 1978 – Mágoa de Boiadeiro
 1978 – Natureza
 1979 – Sérgio Reis
 1980 – Sérgio Reis
 1980 – Sérgio Reis – Disco de ouro
 1981 – Boiadeiro Errante
 1982 – O Melhor de Sérgio Reis
 1982 – Os Grandes Sucessos de Sérgio Reis
 1982 – A Sanfona do Menino
 1983 – Sérgio Reis – Disco de ouro
 1983 – Sérgio Reis
 1984 – Sérgio Reis
 1985 – Sérgio Reis
 1985 – O Melhor de Sérgio Reis – Vol. 2
 1987 – Sérgio Reis
 1988 – Sérgio Reis
 1989 – Sérgio Reis
 1990 – Pantaneiro
 1991 – Sérgio Reis
 1993 – Sérgio Reis
 1993 – Sérgio Reis – Acervo Especial
 1994 – Ventos Uivantes
 1995 – Grandes Sucessos de Sérgio Reis
 1995 – Os Originais – Sérgio Reis
 1996 – Marcando Estrada
 1996 – O Rei do Gado
 1997 – Vida Violeira
 1997 – Boiadeiro
 1998 – Sérgio Reis – Coleção JT
 1998 – Sérgio Reis – Do Tamanho do Brasil
 1998 – Essencial
 1999 – Sérgio Reis – Popularidade
 1999 – Essencial de Sérgio Reis
 1999 – Melhor de Sérgio Reis
 2000 – Série Bis – Jovem Guarda
 2000 – Sérgio Reis – Dose Dupla
 2000 – 40 anos de Estrada
 2000 – Sérgio Reis & Convidados
 2000 – Sérgio Reis
 2001 – Sérgio Reis – 100 anos de Música
 2002 – Sérgio Reis – Nossas Canções
 2003 – O Divino Espírito do Sertão
 2003 – Sérgio Reis e Filhos – Violas e Violeiros
 2007 – Tributo a Goiás
 2008 – Coração Estradeiro
 2009 – 50 Anos Cantando o Brasil
 2010 – Amizade Sincera (ao vivo, com Renato Teixeira)
 2013 – Questão de Tempo

Acting career
Films
O Menino da Porteira (1976) – Diogo Mendonça
Mágoas de Boiadeiro (1977)
Filho Adotivo (1984)

Television
 Paraiso (1982)
 Pantanal (1990 – Rede Manchete) – Tibério
 A História de Ana Raio e Zé Trovão (1990/1991– Manchete)
 O Rei do Gado (1996/1997– Rede Globo)- Zé Bento (Saracura)
 Canavial de Paixões (2003/2004– SBT)
 Bicho do Mato (2006– Record)- Geraldo

References

[ Biography], Allmusic

1940 births
Living people
20th-century Brazilian male singers
20th-century Brazilian singers
Latin Grammy Award winners
Brazilian male film actors
Brazilian male telenovela actors
Male actors from São Paulo
Brazilian people of Italian descent
Republicans (Brazil) politicians
21st-century Brazilian male singers
21st-century Brazilian singers